Clare Colvin is a journalist and writer. She is the opera critic for the Sunday Express, and a book reviewer for the Daily Mail. Her father is Ian Colvin.

Partial bibliography
A Fatal Season (Duckworth, 1996)
Masque of the Gonzagas (Arcadia, 1999)
The Mirror Makers (Hutchinson/Arrow, 2003)

References

External links 
Official website

Year of birth missing (living people)
Living people
British journalists
British women journalists
British women literary critics
British literary critics
British music critics
British women music critics